Rakthamichthys is a genus of swamp eels that are endemic to India. Three species are known from the Western Ghats and one is known from Northeast India. 

All species live underground, with one species (R. rongsaw) having a fossorial lifestyle and three species (R. digressus, R. roseni, and R. indicus) being troglobitic in nature. All species display adaptations to this lifestyle, including a bright red coloration and highly reduced eyes.

Taxonomy 
All four species were formerly classified in the genus Monopterus until a 2020 study found significant genetic and osteological differences between them and the rest of Monopterus, including unique and highly divergent characteristics in the gill arch skeleton. This led to the species being classified in a new genus Rakthamichthys, with "raktham" meaning "blood-red" in Malayalam, as a reference to their distinctive coloration.

Species 

 Rakthamichthys digressus (K. C. Gopi, 2002) (blind eel)
 Rakthamichthys indicus (Eapen, 1963) (Malabar blind swamp eel) (=Monopterus eapeni Talwar, 1991)
 Rakthamichthys mumba (Jayasimhan, Thackeray, Mohapatra & Kumar, 2021)
 Rakthamichthys rongsaw (Britz, D. Sykes, Gower, & Kamei, 2018) 
 Rakthamichthys roseni (R. M. Bailey & Gans, 1998)

References 

 
Cave fish
Freshwater fish genera
Synbranchidae
Freshwater fish of India
Taxa named by Ralf Britz
Taxa named by Neelesh Dahanukar
Taxa named by Rajeev Raghavan